ForstmannLeff Associates is an institutional money management firm. It was cofounded by J. Anthony Forstmann and Joel B. Leff in 1968.   The firm is also known as one   of the original hedge funds in the US.  In 1985, the firm had a capitalization of $3.5 billion.

Firm history

In 2005, Old Mutual Asset Management  bought   a controlling interest in the firm, and changed the name to ForstmanLeff LLC. In January 2006, the new firm was acquired by its management team in partnership with Angelo, Gordon & Co., a privately held investment firm; The new firm's name was changed in 2007 to AG Asset Management 

Currently, AG Asset Management LLC operates in the financial services industry. The Company specializes in equity portfolios, mutual funds, and public equity markets. AG Asset primarily provides its services to high net worth individuals.

AG Asset Management is located in New York, United States.

Clients

The firm's clients included, among others, the following: 

 Intel
 Pfizer
 Standard Oil of Indiana
 The Pension Guarantee Corp.
 The Ford Family
 Northrop
 Honeywell
 Lockheed
 Northwest Airlines
 Knight Ridder
 Delta Airlines
 Texas Instruments
 Raychem
 Studebaker
 Chrysler
 Commercial Credit
 MCA Universal
 City of New York
 State of Minnesota
 State of Maine
 Holy Cross University
 The Archdiocese of New York

References

Financial services companies of the United States
American companies established in 1968
Financial services companies established in 1968